The 1990 Penn State Nittany Lions football team represented the Pennsylvania State University in the 1990 NCAA Division I-A football season. The team was coached by Joe Paterno and played its home games in Beaver Stadium in University Park, Pennsylvania.

Schedule

Roster

Season summary

at USC

at West Virginia

Notre Dame

vs. Florida State (Blockbuster Bowl)

NFL Draft
Six Nittany Lions were drafted in the 1991 NFL Draft.

References

Penn State
Penn State Nittany Lions football seasons
Lambert-Meadowlands Trophy seasons
Penn State Nittany Lions football